Graham Stack may refer to:

Graham Stack (footballer) (born 1981), football goalkeeper
Graham Stack (record producer), English born record producer and songwriter
Graham Stack (surgeon) (1915–1992), orthopedic surgeon